The 2017 IFSC Climbing World Cup was held in 15 locations. Bouldering competitions were held in 7 locations, lead in 8 locations, and speed in 7 locations. The season began on 7 April in Meiringen, Switzerland and concluded on 12 November in Kranj, Slovenia.

The top 3 in each competition received medals, and the overall winners were awarded trophies. At the end of the season an overall ranking was determined based upon points, which athletes were awarded for finishing in the top 30 of each individual event.

The winners for bouldering were Jongwon Chon and Shauna Coxsey, for lead Romain Desgranges and Janja Garnbret, and for speed Vladislav Deulin and Anouck Jaubert, men and women respectively.

Highlights of the season 
In lead climbing, Janja Garnbret of Slovenia was the only athlete who never missed a podium in all 8 lead competitions of the season.

In speed climbing, at the first Speed World Cup of the season in Chongqing, Iuliia Kaplina of Russia set a new world record of 7.46 seconds, breaking her previous world record of 7.53 seconds she set at the 2015 Speed World Cup in Chamonix.
Then the next week, at the World Cup in Nanjing, Reza Alipour of Iran and Russia's Iuliia Kaplina set new world records on their way to the men's and women's speed titles of 5.48 and 7.38 seconds respectively. The previous world record for the men was set at 5.60sec by Danyil Boldyrev of Ukraine at the IFSC World Championships in 2014, while for the women was 7.46sec by Iuliia Kaplina herself just a week before in Chongqing.

Changes from the previous season 
For the 2017 season, the IFSC changed the timing method for the finals of World Cup tournaments. First, climbing time for lead finals was reduced from eight to six minutes. Second, climbing time for bouldering finals was reduced from four minutes plus to four minutes dead. This means climbers can no longer continue their attempt after the four minute mark, even if they're off the mats before the clock runs out, which was the previous rule.

Streaming controversy 
Before the start of the 2017 season, the IFSC announced that they had signed a three-year contract with the streaming platform FloSports, which would have made the streams of climbing World Cups available only to paying customers instead of being freely accessible. This led to an online petition asking the IFSC to change their deal with FloSports, which was signed by more than 12,000 people, and an open letter by the Athletes' Commission. The Commission voiced their frustration over the way the IFSC had previously communicated with the community at large, and "asked the athletes to withdraw cooperation with the livestream media until changes are made". On the next day the IFSC apologized for having made a mistake, and announced that the deal with FloSports had not actually been signed yet despite the earlier press release, and would not be concluded.

Overview

Bouldering 

An overall ranking was determined based upon points, which athletes were awarded for finishing in the top 30 of each individual event.

Men 
6 best competition results were counted (not counting points in brackets) for IFSC Climbing World Cup 2017.

Women 
6 best competition results were counted (not counting points in brackets) for IFSC Climbing World Cup 2017.

National Teams 
For National Team Ranking, 3 best results per competition and category were counted (not counting results in brackets).

Country names as used by the IFSC

Lead 

An overall ranking was determined based upon points, which athletes were awarded for finishing in the top 30 of each individual event.

Men 
7 best competition results were counted (not counting points in brackets) for IFSC Climbing Worldcup 2017. Romain Desgranges won.

Women 
7 best competition results were counted (not counting points in brackets) for IFSC Climbing Worldcup 2017. Janja Garnbret won.

National Teams 
For National Team Ranking, 3 best results per competition and category were counted (not counting results in brackets). Slovenia won.

Speed 

An overall ranking was determined based upon points, which athletes were awarded for finishing in the top 30 of each individual event.

Men 
6 best competition results were counted (not counting points in brackets) for IFSC Climbing World Cup 2017. Vladislav Deulin won.

Women 
6 best competition results were counted (not counting points in brackets) for IFSC Climbing World Cup 2017. Anouck Jaubert won.

National Teams 
For National Team Ranking, 3 best results per competition and category were counted (not counting results in brackets). Russian Federation won.

Combined 
Maximum number of counting results per discipline: Lead: 7, Boulder: 6, Speed: 6. Not counting points are in brackets.

Men 
The results of the ten most successful athletes of the Combined World Cup 2017:

Women 
The results of the ten most successful athletes of the Combined World Cup 2017:

References 

IFSC Climbing World Cup
2017 in sport climbing